Rabbit Run Creek is a tributary of Little Blue River in Adams County, Nebraska in the United States.

Statistics
The Geographic Name Information System I.D. is 832430.

References

Rivers of Nebraska